Calfreisen is a former municipality in the district of Plessur in the canton of Graubünden in Switzerland.  On 1 January 2013 the former municipalities of Calfreisen, Castiel, Langwies, Lüen, Molinis, Peist and St. Peter-Pagig merged into the municipality of Arosa.

History
Calfreisen is first mentioned in 1156 as Caureisene.

Geography
Of this area, 49.5% is used for agricultural purposes, while 30% is forested. Of the rest of the land, 1.7% is settled (buildings or roads) and the remainder (18.8%) is non-productive (rivers, glaciers or mountains).

The former municipality is located in the Schanfigg sub-district of the Plessur district.  It is on the north slope of the Schanfigg mountain.

Demographics
Calfreisen had a population (as of 2010) of 54.  , 20.4% of the population was made up of foreign nationals.  Over the last 10 years the population has grown at a rate of 12.5%.

, the gender distribution of the population was 55.6% male and 44.4% female.  The age distribution, in Calfreisen is; 7 children or 15.6% of the population are between 0 and 9 years old.  4 teenagers or 8.9% are 10 to 14, and 1 teenager is 15 to 19.  Of the adult population, 2 people or 4.4% of the population are between 20 and 29 years old.  6 people or 13.3% are 30 to 39, 8 people or 17.8% are 40 to 49, and 6 people or 13.3% are 50 to 59.  The senior population distribution is 1 person is between 60 and 69 years old, 3 people or 6.7% are 70 to 79, there are 7 people or 15.6% who are 80 to 89.

In the 2007 federal election the most popular party was the SVP which received 63.3% of the vote.  The next three most popular parties were the SP (28.3%), the CVP (5%) and the FDP (3.3%).

In Calfreisen about 77.3% of the population (between age 25–64) have completed either non-mandatory upper secondary education or additional higher education (either University or a Fachhochschule).

Calfreisen has an unemployment rate of 0.4%.  , there were 6 people employed in the primary economic sector and about 3 businesses involved in this sector.  1 person is employed in the secondary sector and there is 1 business in this sector.  1 person is employed in the tertiary sector, with 1 business in this sector.

The historical population is given in the following table:

Languages
Most of the population speaks German (93.3%), with the rest speaking Romansh ( 6.7%).

The historical language use is given in the following table:

References

External links
 Official website 
 

Arosa
Former municipalities of Graubünden